HMS Flirt was a Palmer three funnel, 30 knot destroyer ordered by the Royal Navy under the 1896 – 1897 Naval Estimates.  She was the fifth ship to carry this name since it was introduced in 1782 for a 14-gun brig in service until 1795.

Construction
The two destroyers were repeats of the six destroyers ordered from Palmers under the 1895–1896 programme.

Three funnels were fitted, and 91 tons of coal carried.

Armament was specified as a single QF 12 pounder 12 cwt gun on a platform on the ship's conning tower (in practice the platform was also used as the ship's bridge), backed up by five 6-pounder guns, and two 18-inch (450 mm) torpedo tubes. She had a crew of 60 to 63 officers and men.

Flirt was laid down on 5 September 1896 at the Palmers' shipyard at Jarrow-on-Tyne as Yard number 722 and launched on 15 May 1897. During sea trials she made her contracted speed requirement of 30 knots.  She was completed and accepted by the Royal Navy in April 1899.

Service history

Pre-War
After commissioning Flirt was assigned to the East Coast Flotilla of the 1st Fleet based at Harwich. She served in the Portsmouth instructional flotilla under the command of Commander Michael Henry Hodges until she was paid off in January 1901. Commander Brian Barttelot was appointed in command on 1 August 1902. She took part in the fleet review held at Spithead on 16 August 1902 for the coronation of King Edward VII.

From August to October 1907, Flirt underwent a refit at Portsmouth Dockyard, but collided with a harbour wall on 8 October when returning to harbour after steam trials, damaging her bow. After repair she joined the Harwich destroyer flotilla.

On 30 August 1912 the Admiralty directed all destroyers were to be grouped into classes designated by letters based on contract speed and appearance. As a three-funneled destroyer with a contract speed of 30 knots, Flirt was assigned to the C Class. The class letters were painted on the hull below the bridge area and on a funnel.

World War I
For the test mobilization in July 1914 she was assigned to the 6th Destroyer Flotilla based at Dover.  During her deployment there she was involved in anti-submarine, counter-mining patrols and defending the drifters of the Dover Barrage.

On 28 October 1914 Flirt took part in operations off the Belgian coast.

Loss
On the night of 26/27 October 1916 the German Navy raided the Dover Barrage with two and a half flotillas of torpedo boats and destroyers. Flirt responded to gunfire from the drifter line.  She found the drifter Waveney II on fire and sent a boat to assist. When unidentified ships approached she issued a challenge and was immediately fired upon by the Germans. Flirt was lost; the only survivors were those dispatched to aid Waveney II.

She was awarded the battle honour "Belgian Coast 1914 – 15" for her service.

Pennant numbers

Further reading
Captain Evans tells in his book Keeping the Seas that the life boat carrying the last survivors of Flirt was depth charged by a passing destroyer who thought it was a submarine.  A real enemy submarine in the area also "took a look at them" and in the darkness mistook them for a British submarine, and dived to escape destruction.

Notes

References
 

 
 

 

 

Ships built on the River Tyne
1897 ships
C-class destroyers (1913)
World War I destroyers of the United Kingdom
Maritime incidents in 1916
World War I shipwrecks in the English Channel